IR TANGER, commonly known as Ittihad Tanger or Ittihad Riadhi de Tanger, is a Moroccan basketball club based in Tanger. Established in 1983, it is part of the multi-sports club which also has a football section. The team plays in the first-tier league Division Excellence and has won three championships, its last one being in 2009. Home games of Ittihad are played at the Salle Badr.

Honours
Division Excellence
Champions (3): 1992–93, 2007–08, 2008–09
Runners-up (1): 2005–06
 Moroccan Throne CupChampions (2): 2005–06, 2021–22
Runners-up (4): 1993–94, 1995–96, 2006–07, 2014–15Tournoi Mansour Lahrizi'''
Runners-up (1): 2007

References

External links
IRT Tanger at Afrobasket.com
Official Instagram profile

Basketball teams established in 1983
Sport in Tangier
Basketball teams in Morocco